Peter Scanlon (born 3 January 1970) is an Australian taekwondo practitioner. He competed in the men's flyweight at the 1988 Summer Olympics.

References

External links
 

1970 births
Place of birth unknown
Living people
Australian male taekwondo practitioners
Olympic taekwondo practitioners of Australia
Taekwondo practitioners at the 1988 Summer Olympics
20th-century Australian people